Lyubov Ivanovna Dobrzhanskaya (December 24, 1905, Kiev — November 3, 1980, Moscow) was a Soviet singer and actress of theater and cinema. She won the Stalin Prize II degree in 1951 and the People's Artist of the USSR Award in 1965. She is best known for her roles in films Beware of the Car (as Detochkin's mother) and The Irony of Fate (as Zhenya's mother).

Biography
Dobrzhanskaya was born  to a noble family on December 24, 1905 in Kiev.

In 1923-1924 she studied at the theater studio. In 1934 she began acting in the Russian Army Theatre in Moscow where Aleksey Popov had a great influence on her art.

She participated in various concerts. Her performances of romances enjoyed great success. She was also the author of Leonid Utyosov's song Under the Spring Foliage.

She was married four times but had no children.

Lyubov Dobrzhanskaya died on November 3, 1980 in Moscow. She was buried at the Vagankovo Cemetery.

References

External links
 
 «Мировая мама» была киевлянкой!

1905 births
Musicians from Kyiv
1980 deaths
Soviet stage actresses
Soviet film actresses
People's Artists of the USSR
People's Artists of the RSFSR
Honored Artists of the RSFSR
Recipients of the Order of Lenin
Stalin Prize winners
Burials at Vagankovo Cemetery
Soviet Jews
Actors from Kyiv